Elsynge may refer to:

Henry Elsynge
Elsynge Palace